Boyd Kevin Rutherford (born April 1, 1957) is an American politician, businessman and attorney who served as the ninth lieutenant governor of Maryland from 2015 to 2023. 

A member of the Republican Party, Rutherford was nominated by President George W. Bush to serve as Associate Administrator in the U.S. General Services Administration, serving from 2001 to 2003. Rutherford then joined the administration of Governor Bob Ehrlich, serving as the Secretary of General Services from 2003 to 2006. He served as Assistant Secretary for Administration to the United States Department of Agriculture from 2006 to 2009.

Early life and education
Rutherford was born in Washington, D.C., and graduated from Archbishop Carroll High School. He holds a bachelor's degree in economics and political science from Howard University, which he earned in 1979. In 1990, Rutherford earned both a Juris Doctor degree and a master's degree in communications management from the University of Southern California.

Rutherford is a member of the State Bars of California and Maryland, as well as the District of Columbia bar. He has practiced law in Southern California, Washington, D.C., and Baltimore. He has been serving since January 21, 2015.

Career

Business career
In addition to his public service, Rutherford has a broad career in law and business. At the time of his election in 2014, Rutherford served as an attorney with the firm of Benton Potter & Murdock, which has offices in Maryland, Virginia, and the District of Columbia. He served as Associate Administrator for the U.S. General Services Administration; during his time there, he worked with small businesses in government and improving the agency. Rutherford served as the Secretary of the Maryland Department of General Services. He was responsible for over $900 million in annual contract administration, while finding creative ways to save the taxpayers of Maryland money and completing expansion of State buildings.

Additionally, following the resignation of Michael J. Harrison, Rutherford was nominated by George W. Bush as Assistant Secretary for Administration for the United States Department of Agriculture (USDA), where he was able to save millions of taxpayer dollars. He has also worked in information technology sales, and small and minority business development. Rutherford previously served on the Baltimore City Brownfields Redevelopment Council and on the Board of the Corridor Transportation Corporation.

Political career and civic associations

Rutherford served on the Howard County Republican Central Committee from 1996 to 2002 and was a delegate to the Republican National Convention in 2000. From 2009 to 2011, Rutherford served as Chief Administrative Officer of the Republican National Committee.

Tenure as lieutenant governor
Rutherford is the third consecutive African American elected to the office of Lieutenant Governor in Maryland. While Governor Larry Hogan was going through treatment for lymphoma, Rutherford often acted as governor. In December 2015, he criticized fantasy football sites, voicing his opinion that they were gambling sites. As a candidate, Rutherford was noted as someone who would “make the trains run on time” and for his focus on making the government more effective.

Post-lieutenant gubernatorial career

Rutherford, who was seen as the likely Republican frontrunner in the 2022 Maryland gubernatorial election, announced in April 2021 that would not seek to succeed Governor Larry Hogan. During the Republican primary, he endorsed former Maryland Secretary of Commerce Kelly M. Schulz. After Schulz was defeated by state delegate Dan Cox in the primary, Rutherford declined to endorse Cox and predicted that Democratic nominee Wes Moore would defeat him in the general election.

In January 2023, Rutherford joined Columbia, Maryland law firm Davis, Agnor, Rapaport & Skalny LLC as a government relations and lobbying personnel. In March 2023, Rutherford published Rutherford's Travels, a book that documents his visits to all 76 Maryland state parks during his tenure as lieutenant governor.

Personal life
Rutherford and his wife Monica live in Columbia, Maryland, and they have three adult children; one son and two daughters.

See also
 List of African-American Republicans
 List of minority governors and lieutenant governors in the United States

References

1957 births
20th-century American businesspeople
21st-century American businesspeople
21st-century American politicians
African-American people in Maryland politics
African-American state cabinet secretaries
Archbishop Carroll High School (Washington, D.C.) alumni
George W. Bush administration personnel
Howard University alumni
Lieutenant Governors of Maryland
Living people
Maryland Republicans
People from Columbia, Maryland
People from Washington, D.C.
State cabinet secretaries of Maryland
United States Department of Agriculture officials
USC Annenberg School for Communication and Journalism alumni
Black conservatism in the United States